The Pearl Jam Twenty Tour (also known as the PJ20 Tour) was a concert tour by the American rock band Pearl Jam to celebrate the band's 20th anniversary.  The tour consisted of a two-day festival at the Alpine Valley Music Theatre in East Troy, Wisconsin on the Labor Day weekend, and was followed by ten shows in Canada, ending with a show at the Pacific Coliseum, Vancouver. The festival dates had support from Queens of the Stone Age, Mudhoney, Liam Finn, John Doe and The Strokes. Due to high ticket demand for pre-sale tickets, the website had to be taken offline.

On July 11, the band announced an additional nine dates in Latin America, scheduled for November. This was the second time that the band had toured Latin America, after their 2005 tour and included a show in San José, Costa Rica. On August 19, a second date was added in São Paulo. American punk band X were announced as the opening band for the Latin American shows.

History
The opening show at Alpine Valley featured songs by Mother Love Bone and Temple of the Dog with Chris Cornell on vocals. This was then repeated for the second show. During the first show at the Air Canada Centre in Toronto, the band were joined onstage by Neil Young during their performance of "Rockin' in the Free World". The show was later released exclusively as a free digital download through Google Music on November 10 in celebration of the upcoming, official launch of that site on November 16.

Opening acts
Mudhoney — North America (excluding Costa Rica and Mexico)
X — South America, Costa Rica and Mexico

Tour dates

Band members
Pearl Jam
Jeff Ament – bass guitar
Stone Gossard – rhythm guitar
Mike McCready – lead guitar
Eddie Vedder – lead vocals, guitar
Matt Cameron – drums

Additional musicians
Boom Gaspar – Hammond B3 and keyboards

Gallery

References

2011 concert tours
Pearl Jam concert tours